The 70th Annual Tony Awards were held on June 12, 2016, to recognize achievement in Broadway productions during the 2015–16 season. The ceremony temporarily returned to the Beacon Theatre in New York City after three years at Radio City Music Hall and was broadcast live by CBS. James Corden served as host.

Hamilton received a record-setting 16 nominations in 13 categories, ultimately winning 11 awards, the second-most for a single production in Tony history. The revival of The Color Purple won two awards. The Humans won four awards, and the revival productions of plays Long Day's Journey into Night and A View from the Bridge each won two awards.

The ceremony received positive reviews, with many highlighting the performance of Corden as host. At the 69th Primetime Emmy Awards, it won the Primetime Emmy Award for Outstanding Special Class Program, and was nominated for Outstanding Writing for a Variety Special, Outstanding Technical Direction, Camerawork, Video Control for a Limited Series, Movie, or Special and Outstanding Lighting Design / Lighting Direction for a Variety Special.

Eligibility
Shows that opened on Broadway during the 2015–2016 season before April 28, 2016, were eligible for consideration.

Original plays
An Act of God
China Doll
Eclipsed
The Father
The Humans
King Charles III
Misery
Our Mother's Brief Affair
Thérèse Raquin

Original musicals
Allegiance
Amazing Grace
American Psycho
Bright Star
Disaster!
Hamilton
On Your Feet!
School of Rock
Shuffle Along
Tuck Everlasting
Waitress

Play revivals
Blackbird
The Crucible
Fool for Love
Fully Committed
The Gin Game
Hughie
Long Day's Journey into Night
Noises Off
Old Times
Sylvia
A View from the Bridge

Musical revivals
The Color Purple
Dames at Sea
Fiddler on the Roof
She Loves Me
Spring Awakening

Awards events

Nominations
The Tony Award nominations were announced on May 3, 2016, by Nikki M. James and Andrew Rannells.

Hamilton garnered 16 nominations—the most received by any Broadway production to date. Following Hamilton, the season's most-nominated shows included Shuffle Along with 10 nominations and the Roundabout Theatre Company revival of She Loves Me with eight. The revival of Long Day's Journey into Night—also produced by Roundabout—received seven nominations. New plays Eclipsed and The Humans both received six nominations.

The 2015–16 season marked the first time since 1960 and the fourth time in history that five shows had been nominated for Best Musical.

Other events
The annual Meet the Nominees Press Reception took place on May 4, 2016, at the Paramount Hotel. The annual Nominees Luncheon took place on May 19, 2016, at the Paramount Hotel. A toast honoring the season's Creative Arts nominees was held at the Lambs Club on May 24, 2016. A private reception and cocktail party was held on June 6, 2016, at the Paramount Hotel's Diamond Horseshoe to honor the recipients of the season's Tony Honors for Excellence.

Ceremony
The ceremony was dedicated in honor of the victims of the Orlando nightclub shooting, which had occurred earlier that morning. Corden addressed the shooting in a speech at the beginning of the telecast, stating "All we can say is that you are not on your own right now, your tragedy is our tragedy. Theater is a place where every race, creed, sexuality, and gender is equal, is embraced and is loved. Hate will never win." Winners Lin-Manuel Miranda and Frank Langella also addressed the shooting in their acceptance speeches. Miranda read a sonnet that he had written, which included the passage "Love is love is love is love is love is love is love is love; Cannot be killed or swept aside." In respect toward the victims of the shooting, the cast of Hamilton dropped the use of muskets from their performance of "Yorktown (The World Turned Upside Down)" at the ceremony.

Presenters
The ceremony's presenters included:

|
 Jake Gyllenhaal – presented Best Featured Actress in a Play
 Andrew Lloyd Webber – introduced School of Rock
 Aaron Tveit and Mary Elizabeth Winstead – presented Best Featured Actress in a Musical
 Patina Miller and Daniel Dae Kim – presented Best Featured Actor in a Musical
 Carole King – presented Best Original Score 
 Meg Ryan – introduced She Loves Me
 Jesse Tyler Ferguson and Lucy Liu – presented Best Direction of a Play and Best Direction of a Musical
 Josh Groban – introduced Fiddler on the Roof
 Andrew Rannells and Saoirse Ronan – presented Best Featured Actor in a Play 
 Steve Martin and Edie Brickell  – introduced Bright Star
 Oprah Winfrey – introduced The Color Purple
 James Earl Jones and Angela Lansbury – special presentation on the Tonys history
 Nathan Lane – presented Best Actress in a Play

 Emilio Estefan – introduced On Your Feet!
 Cate Blanchett – presented Best Actor in a Play
 Marlee Matlin – presented Spring Awakening
 Diane Lane –  presented Best Revival of a Play
 Blair Underwood – presented Excellence in Theatre Education Award
 Barack Obama, Michelle Obama and Common – introduced Hamilton
 Christian Borle and Nikki M. James – presenters of the Creative Arts winners
 Claire Danes – presented Best Play
 Keri Russell – introduced Waitress
 Bebe Neuwirth – tribute to Chicago
 Sean Hayes and Uzo Aduba – presented Best Revival of a Musical
 Chita Rivera – presenter of the In Memoriam tribute
 Neil Patrick Harris – presented Best Actor in a Musical
 Audra McDonald – presented Best Actress in a Musical
 Barbra Streisand – presented Best Musical

Performances
The following shows and performers performed on the ceremony's telecast:

"This Could Be You" – James Corden
"You're In The Band" – School of Rock
"Broadway Blues" – Shuffle Along
"Ilona" / "She Loves Me" / "Vanilla Ice Cream" – She Loves Me
"Sunrise, Sunset" / "The Wedding Dance" – Fiddler on the Roof
"If You Knew My Story" – Bright Star (Steve Martin and Edie Brickell appeared with the company)
"Mysterious Ways" / "I'm Here" – The Color Purple
"Mega Mix" ("Rhythm is Gonna Get You" / "Conga" / "Oye" / "Turn the Beat Around" / "Everlasting Love" / "Get on Your Feet")  – On Your Feet! (Gloria Estefan performed with the company)

Broadway Carpool Karaoke ("On Broadway" / "Alexander Hamilton/Guns and Ships" / "Seasons of Love" / "Can't Take My Eyes Off You" / "One Day More") – James Corden, Lin-Manuel Miranda, Audra McDonald, Jesse Tyler Ferguson, and Jane Krakowski
"Mama Who Bore Me" / "The Bitch of Living" – Spring Awakening
"History Has Its Eyes on You" / "Yorktown (The World Turned Upside Down)" – Hamilton
"Opening Up" / "She Used to Be Mine" – Waitress (Sara Bareilles performed with the company)
"The Schuyler Sisters" – Hamilton

Performances that were introduced by individuals who had a relationship with the show included: Steve Martin and Edie Brickell for Bright Star; Oprah Winfrey for The Color Purple; Josh Groban for Fiddler on the Roof; Emilio Estefan for On Your Feet!; Andrew Lloyd Webber for School of Rock; Meg Ryan for She Loves Me; Marlee Matlin for Spring Awakening; and Keri Russell for Waitress. President Obama and Michelle Obama, in a recorded appearance, spoke of seeing the beginnings of Hamilton at the White House. The ceremony also featured a special tribute performance in honor of the 20-year anniversary of the revival production of the musical Chicago, featuring Bebe Neuwirth and company.

The opening number, “That Could Be Me/This Could Be You,” was created by host Corden and Gary Barlow, consisting of snippets from many musicals with Corden and the ensemble replicating shows such as Les Misérables, The Lion King, and ending with 42nd Street. During the ceremony, outside the Beacon Theatre, cast members of nominated shows and other nominees performed brief performance excerpts of iconic shows in the Broadway canon, ranging from The Phantom of the Opera to Annie to Rent. The show closed with the cast of Hamilton performing "The Schuyler Sisters".

Non-competitive awards
The 2016 Tony Honors for Excellence were awarded to voice coach Joan Lader, attorney Seth Gelblum, and Sally Ann Parsons, owner of the costume shop Parsons-Meares. Lyricist Sheldon Harnick and Circle Repertory Company founder Marshall W. Mason received Special Tony Awards for Lifetime Achievement. The National Endowment for the Arts and Miles Wilkin, COO and executive vice president of Key Brand Entertainment, received the season's Special Tony Awards. Paper Mill Playhouse in Millburn, New Jersey received the Regional Theatre Tony Award. Brian Stokes Mitchell was named as recipient of the Isabelle Stevenson Award for his work with the Actors Fund. The season's Excellence in Theatre Education Award was awarded to drama teacher Marilyn McCormick of Cass Technical High School in Detroit.

Winners and nominees
Sources: Playbill; The New York Times; The Guardian	

{| class="wikitable" style="width:100%;"
! width:50%;"| Best Play ‡
! width:50%;"| Best Musical ‡ 
|-
| valign="top" |
 The Humans - Stephen Karam
Eclipsed - Danai Gurira
 The Father - Florian Zeller
 King Charles III - Mike Bartlett
| valign="top" |
 Hamilton
 Bright Star
 School of Rock
 Shuffle Along, or, the Making of the Musical Sensation of 1921 and All That Followed
 Waitress
|-
! width=;"50%"| Best Revival of a Play ‡
! width=;"50%"| Best Revival of a Musical ‡ 
|-
| valign="top" |
 A View from the Bridge
 Blackbird
 The Crucible
 Long Day's Journey Into Night
 Noises Off
| valign="top" |
 The Color Purple
 Fiddler on the Roof
 She Loves Me
 Spring Awakening
|-
! width=;"50%"| Best Performance by a Leading Actor in a Play
! width=;"50%"| Best Performance by a Leading Actress in a Play
|-
| valign="top" |
 Frank Langella – The Father as Andre
 Gabriel Byrne – Long Day's Journey into Night as James Tyrone
 Jeff Daniels – Blackbird as Ray
 Tim Pigott-Smith – King Charles III as Charles
 Mark Strong – A View from the Bridge as Eddie Carbone
| valign="top" |
 Jessica Lange – Long Day's Journey into Night as Mary Tyrone
 Laurie Metcalf – Misery as Annie Wilkes
 Lupita Nyong'o – Eclipsed as The Girl
 Sophie Okonedo – The Crucible as Elizabeth Proctor
 Michelle Williams – Blackbird as Una Spencer
|-
! width=;"50%"| Best Performance by a Leading Actor in a Musical
! width=;"50%"| Best Performance by a Leading Actress in a Musical
|-
| valign="top" |
 Leslie Odom Jr. – Hamilton as Aaron Burr
 Alex Brightman – School of Rock as Dewey Finn
 Danny Burstein – Fiddler on the Roof as Tevye
 Zachary Levi – She Loves Me as Georg Nowack
 Lin-Manuel Miranda – Hamilton as Alexander Hamilton
| valign="top" | Cynthia Erivo – The Color Purple as Celie Harris Johnson Laura Benanti – She Loves Me as Amalia Balash
 Carmen Cusack – Bright Star as Alice Murphy
 Jessie Mueller – Waitress as Jenna Hunterson
 Phillipa Soo – Hamilton as Eliza Hamilton
|-
! width=;"50%"| Best Performance by a Featured Actor in a Play
! width=;"50%"| Best Performance by a Featured Actress in a Play
|-
| valign="top" |
 Reed Birney – The Humans as Erik Blake Bill Camp – The Crucible as Reverend John Hale
 David Furr – Noises Off as Gary Lejeune
 Richard Goulding – King Charles III as Prince Harry
 Michael Shannon – Long Day's Journey into Night as James Tyrone, Jr.
| valign="top" |
 Jayne Houdyshell – The Humans as Deirdre Blake Pascale Armand – Eclipsed as Wife #3
 Megan Hilty – Noises Off as Brooke Ashton
 Andrea Martin – Noises Off as Dotty Otley
 Saycon Sengbloh – Eclipsed as Wife #1
|-
! width=;"50%"| Best Performance by a Featured Actor in a Musical
! width=;"50%"| Best Performance by a Featured Actress in a Musical
|-
| valign="top" |
 Daveed Diggs – Hamilton as Marquis de Lafayette / Thomas Jefferson Brandon Victor Dixon – Shuffle Along as Eubie Blake
 Christopher Fitzgerald – Waitress as Ogie
 Jonathan Groff – Hamilton as King George III
 Christopher Jackson – Hamilton as George Washington
| valign="top" |
 Renée Elise Goldsberry – Hamilton as Angelica SchuylerDanielle Brooks – The Color Purple as Sofia Johnson
 Jane Krakowski – She Loves Me as Ilona Ritter
Jennifer Simard – Disaster! as Sister Mary Downy
 Adrienne Warren – Shuffle Along as Gertrude Saunders / Florence Mills
|-
! width=;"50%"| Best Book of a Musical
! width=;"50%"| Best Original Score (Music and/or Lyrics) Written for the Theatre
|-
| valign="top" |
 Hamilton – Lin-Manuel Miranda Bright Star – Steve Martin
 School of Rock – Julian Fellowes
 Shuffle Along – George C. Wolfe
| valign="top" |
 Hamilton – Lin-Manuel Miranda (music and lyrics) Bright Star – Edie Brickell (music and lyrics) and Steve Martin (music)
 School of Rock – Andrew Lloyd Webber (music) and Glenn Slater (lyrics)
 Waitress – Sara Bareilles (music and lyrics)
|-
! width=;"50%"| Best Scenic Design of a Play
! width=;"50%"| Best Scenic Design of a Musical
|-
| valign="top" |
 David Zinn – The Humans Beowulf Boritt – Thérèse Raquin
 Christopher Oram – Hughie
 Jan Versweyveld – A View from the Bridge
| valign="top" |
 David Rockwell – She Loves Me Es Devlin and Finn Ross – American Psycho
 David Korins – Hamilton
 Santo Loquasto – Shuffle Along
|-
! width=;"50%"| Best Costume Design of a Play
! width=;"50%"| Best Costume Design of a Musical
|-
| valign="top" |
 Clint Ramos – Eclipsed Jane Greenwood – Long Day's Journey into Night
 Michael Krass – Noises Off
 Tom Scutt – King Charles III
| valign="top" |
 Paul Tazewell – Hamilton Gregg Barnes – Tuck Everlasting
 Jeff Mahshie – She Loves Me
 Ann Roth – Shuffle Along
|-
! width=;"50%"| Best Lighting Design of a Play
! width=;"50%"| Best Lighting Design of a Musical
|-
| valign="top" |
 Natasha Katz – Long Day's Journey into Night Justin Townsend – The Humans
 Jan Versweyveld – The Crucible
 Jan Versweyveld – A View from the Bridge
| valign="top"|
 Howell Binkley – Hamilton Jules Fisher and Peggy Eisenhauer – Shuffle Along
 Ben Stanton – Spring Awakening
 Justin Townsend – American Psycho
|-
! width=;"50%"| Best Direction of a Play
! width=;"50%"| Best Direction of a Musical
|-
| valign="top" |
 Ivo van Hove – A View from the Bridge Rupert Goold – King Charles III
 Jonathan Kent – Long Day's Journey into Night
 Joe Mantello – The Humans
 Liesl Tommy – Eclipsed
| valign="top" |
 Thomas Kail – Hamilton Michael Arden – Spring Awakening
 John Doyle – The Color Purple
 Scott Ellis – She Loves Me
 George C. Wolfe – Shuffle Along
|-
! width=;"50%"| Best Choreography
! width=;"50%"| Best Orchestrations
|-
| valign="top" |
 Andy Blankenbuehler – Hamilton Savion Glover – Shuffle Along
 Hofesh Shechter – Fiddler on the Roof
 Randy Skinner – Dames at Sea
 Sergio Trujillo – On Your Feet!
| valign="top" |
 Alex Lacamoire – Hamilton' August Eriksmoen – Bright Star Larry Hochman – She Loves Me Daryl Waters – Shuffle Along|}

‡ The award is presented to the producer(s) of the musical or play.

Awards and nominations per production

Individuals with multiple nominations
 3: Lin-Manuel Miranda; Jan Versweyveld
 2:  Steve Martin; Justin Townsend; George C. Wolfe

Reception
The show received a positive reception from media publications. Some media outlets received the broadcast more positively with praise for Corden and how he dealt with the Orlando nightclub shooting. The Hollywood Reporter columnist David Rooney remarked, "In terms of Corden's overall performance as host, it was very much in line with his Late Late Show monologues — sweet and upbeat, if not the least bit risky or cutting-edge. Despite the inevitable longueurs that set in as the evening wore on, for the most part he kept the show moving briskly with affable appearances to paper the gaps." Television critic Robert Lloyd of the Los Angeles Times remarked, "Where Neil Patrick Harris, who once seemed to have permanent first-refusal rights on the job, is a cool cat, Corden is a ball of energy, a big dog that won't stop licking your face; but it is a style that works for him." The New York Times theatre critic Charles Isherwood commented, "Was a bit jarring moving to comedy, but Mr. Corden is such a genial presence."

In addition, Maureen Ryan from Variety wrote, "Corden was an energetic host, even if the opening number meant to showcase his lifelong love of theater felt as though it went on a little long. There was also the inevitable Carpool Karaoke number. Corden was an affable host, and his opening remarks on Orlando were short but effective." Frazier Moore of the Rolling Stone wrote, "On a night that was marked by tragedy — and occurring mere hours after news broke of the deadly mass shooting in Orlando, Florida — the Tonys provided a much-needed bit of levity. The performers and honorees didn't shy away from speaking about the shocking events of the day, but the overall mood was one of celebration. Part of the credit goes to the master of ceremonies James Corden, best known as the goofy host CBS's Late Late Show, yet still a dorky theater kid at heart; his charming, cheerful persona brought an upbeat mood to the proceedings." The Washington Post'' theatre critic Peter Marks gave high marks toward Corden saying, "Corden served for the first time Sunday night as host of the Tony Awards and, as a result, ushered in a completely pleasurable Era of Good Feeling for an awards ceremony, and an industry, badly in need of one."

Ratings
The ceremony averaged a Nielsen 6.8 ratings/11 share, and was watched by 8.7 million viewers. The ratings was a 33 percent increase from previous ceremony's viewership of 6.4 million, becoming the highest rating in over 15 years.

In Memoriam
An orchestra was performing in the tribute as images of theatre personalities who died in the past year were shown in the following order.

Doris Roberts
Sir Peter Shaffer
Billie Allen
Arnold Wesker
Patty Duke
Anne Jackson
Robert de Michiell
Ken Howard
Maureen O'Hara
Michael White
Biff Liff
Brian Bedford
Kyle Jean-Baptiste
Brian Friel
Patricia Elliott
Richard Libertini
Dean Jones
Elizabeth Swados
Alan Rickman
David Margulies
David Bowie
Saeed Jaffrey
Frank D. Gilroy
Theodore Bikel
Dick Van Patten
Donald R. Seawell
Roger Rees

See also
 Drama Desk Awards
 2016 Laurence Olivier Awards – equivalent awards for West End theatre productions
 Obie Award
 New York Drama Critics' Circle
 Theatre World Award
 Lucille Lortel Awards

References

External links
 

2016 awards in the United States
2016 in New York City
2010s in Manhattan
2016 theatre awards
June 2016 events in the United States
Tony Awards ceremonies
Television shows directed by Glenn Weiss